Stardust Planet (formerly known as 3B Junior) is a department of the third section of the Japanese entertainment company Stardust Promotion specialising in idols. Between 2014 and 2018, 3B Junior has been reorganised into an independent Idol group dedicated to training idols.
On July 27, 2018, It was del the first Stardust Planet Festival (Natsu S)

History

Stardust Planet

Groups

Former groups

Timeline

Discography 
Releases under the name of Stardust Planet.

EP

Music videos

3B Junior
 was a department of the third section of the Japanese entertainment company Stardust Promotion specialising in training idols. Initially serving as the company's section dedicated to training female talents under the age of 18.  Since 2014, however, 3B Junior has been reorganised into an independent department dedicated to idols.  Momoiro Clover and Shiritsu Ebisu Chugaku are among popular all-girl idol groups initially founded under the 3B Junior banner.

Members

Former members

Timeline

Musical groups created by 3B Junior 

Active
 Momoiro Clover Z
 Kanako Momota, Shiori Tamai, Ayaka Sasaki, Reni Takagi
 Shiritsu Ebisu Chugaku
 Rika Mayama, Ayaka Yasumoto, Mirei Hoshina, Hinata Kashiwagi, Kaho Kobayashi, Riko Nakayama
 Team Syachihoko
 Honoka Akimoto, Haruna Sakamoto, Nao Sakura, Yuzuki Ōguro
 Tacoyaki Rainbow
 Saki Kiyoi, Kurumi Hori, Karen Negishi, Mai Haruna, Sakura Ayaki

Inactive
 Momonaki
 Creamy Parfait
 Kagajo 4S
 Reina Okusawa, Shiori Odagiri, Ari Fujimoto, Ami Uchiyama
 Minitia Bears
 Karin Saitō, Runa Naitō, Mao Kunimitsu, Meina, Ruka Shiina, Sora Tsukamoto, Chiho Takai, Hina Odagaki, Yukari Kose, Misato Hirase, Maari Takami, Shiori Ishiguro, Aira

Discography
Releases under the name of 3B Junior.

Singles

Albums

Music videos

TV shows 
  (BS Asahi, 24 January 2015 —)

Helium incident 
On February 4, 2015, it was revealed that during the recording of their main TV show 3B Junior Stardust Shoji, on January 28, a 12-year-old member (name withheld) of 3B Junior suffered from an air embolism.  She lost consciousness and fell into a coma (which was a result of the air bubbles blocking the flow of blood to the brain), which was a result of inhaling huge quantities of helium as part of a game. The incident was not made public until a week later. The staff of TV Asahi held an emergency press conference in order to announce that the member had been taken to hospital and, though she had not yet recovered consciousness, was showing signs of rehabilitation such as eye movement and mobility of her limbs. Following this, police launched an investigation into the neglected safety measures. The girl has since returned to school, although no statement has been made as to whether after-effects remain.

References

External links 
 
 
 

Stardust Promotion artists
Japanese girl groups
Japanese idol groups